Robert Holton may refer to:
 Robert A. Holton (born 1944), American chemist
 Robert J. Holton (born 1946), professor of sociology